Klaus-Dieter Kirchstein is a German bantam boxer who won the bronze medals in international competitions. He competed for the SC Dynamo Berlin / Sportvereinigung (SV) Dynamo.

References 

Bantamweight boxers
Living people
German male boxers
Recipients of the Patriotic Order of Merit
AIBA World Boxing Championships medalists
Year of birth missing (living people)